Chestermere-Strathmore is a provincial electoral district in Alberta, Canada. The district will be one of 87 districts mandated to return a single member (MLA) to the Legislative Assembly of Alberta using the first past the post method of voting. It was contested for the first time in the 2019 Alberta election, and won by Leela Aheer of the United Conservative Party.

Geography
The district is located east of Calgary, containing the City of Chestermere, the Town of Strathmore and sections of Rocky View County and Wheatland County. Its borders are formed by the City of Calgary to the west, the Bow River to the south, Highway 564 to the north, and RR242, RR 241 west of Namaka, and Siksika 146 to the east.

History

The district was created in 2017 when the Electoral Boundaries Commission recommended abolishing Strathmore-Brooks and Chestermere-Rocky View, completely reorganizing the ridings surrounding Calgary to reflect the rapid growth in the area.

Electoral results

2010s

References

Alberta provincial electoral districts